Cabin Lake may refer to:

Cabin Lake, Alberta, a locality in Canada
Cabin Lake (California), a lake in California